Colors is a 1988 American police procedural action crime film starring Sean Penn and Robert Duvall, and directed by Dennis Hopper. The film takes place in the gang ridden neighborhoods of Los Angeles: late-1980s South Central Los Angeles, Echo Park, Westlake and East Los Angeles. The film centers on Bob Hodges (Duvall), an experienced Los Angeles Police Department C.R.A.S.H. officer, and his rookie partner, Danny McGavin (Penn), who try to stop the gang violence between the Bloods, the Crips, and Hispanic street gangs. Colors relaunched Hopper as a director 19 years after Easy Rider, and inspired discussion over its depiction of gang life and gang violence.

Plot
Two policemen, Bob "Uncle Bob" Hodges, a respected LAPD officer and Vietnam veteran, and rookie officer Danny McGavin have just been teamed together in the C.R.A.S.H. unit that patrols Northwest L.A., East L.A. and South Central L.A.

The older cop is appreciated on the local streets. He is diplomatic on the surface, preaching "rapport" to gang members to encourage them to offer help when it is truly needed. Hodges recognizes that every action cops take is scrutinized by the people they are trying to help. Hodges explains his view on policing to his young partner with a joke about bulls and cows.

Although the pair bond quickly, life lessons are seemingly lost on the aggressive, cavalier McGavin, whose stunts soon bring him notoriety among the gang members and the people, such as attacking a graffiti artist by spraying his eyes with the paint can. McGavin wrecks their first unmarked car during a pursuit. Its replacement is vivid yellow, resulting in McGavin being nicknamed "Pac-Man" by officers and gang members alike.

McGavin has a short-lived romance with a waitress named Louisa who, like the offended Hodges, feels the weight of the Pac-Man persona. Amidst the strain of these relationships, the murder of a Bloods gang member escalates tension between two other street gangs. A series of seemingly random incidents culminates with the two partners in the middle of the Crips, Bloods and Hispanic barrio war.

The 21st Street Gang, led by a criminal named Frog, attempts to negotiate a peace similar to Hodges and steer clear of the melee. To protect his partner, Hodges unwittingly exposes Frog as his source on the Crips leader Rocket's scheme to kill McGavin. Each group attempts to right the wrongs against their respective crews as police strive to prevent the hit and stand their authority over the fall out.

In the end, the unit moves in on the would-be last crew standing—the 21st Street Gang. While arresting Frog, Hodges is fatally wounded by a 21st Street Gang gunman, nicknamed “Bird”, trying to do the hit on McGavin. With medics en route, McGavin comforts Hodges and breaks down with regret as the elder partner falls into delirium and dies.

Sometime later, a more reserved McGavin has a rookie partner, a black cop who grew up in the neighborhood where they patrol and sports an attitude like the "Pac-Man". McGavin tells him the same joke about the bulls that Hodges taught him, and the younger officer reciprocates in the same way as the young McGavin. The film ends with McGavin considering the cycle as the pair drive on and continue their patrol.

Cast
 Sean Penn as Police Officer Danny 'Pac-Man' McGavin, Los Angeles Police Department
 Robert Duvall as Police Officer Bob Hodges, Los Angeles Police Department
 María Conchita Alonso as Louisa Gomez
 Randy Brooks as Ron Delaney
 Don Cheadle as 'Rocket'
 Glenn Plummer as Clarence 'High Top' Brown
 Trinidad Silva as Leo 'Frog' Lopez
 Grand L. Bush as Larry 'Looney Tunes' Sylvester
 Damon Wayans as 'T-Bone'
 Leon Robinson as 'Killer Bee'
 Romeo De Lan as Felipe Lopez
 Gerardo Mejía as 'Bird'
 Tony Todd as Vietnam Vet
 Charles Walker as Reed
 Courtney Gains as 'Whitey'
 Mario Lopez as a 21st Street Gang Member
 Karla Montana as Locita
 Brian Davis as Robert 'R.C.' Craig
 Sy Richardson as O.S.S. Sergeant Bailey Los Angeles County Sheriff's Department
 Sherman Augustus as Police Officer Porter, Los Angeles Police Department
 Rudy Ramos as Lieutenant Melindez, Los Angeles Police Department
 Lawrence Cook as Police Officer Young, Los Angeles Police Department
 R.D. Call	as Police Officer Rusty Baines, Los Angeles Police Department
 Clark Johnson as C.R.A.S.H. Police Officer Lee, Los Angeles Police Department
 Jack Nance as Police Officer Samuels, Los Angeles Police Department 
 David Raynr as J.C.

Production
The movie was filmed entirely in Los Angeles in 1987. The original script by Richard Di Lello took place in Chicago and was more about drug dealing than gang members. Dennis Hopper ordered changes, so Michael Schiffer was hired and the setting was changed to Los Angeles and the focus of the story became more about the world of gang members.

The joke that Hodges tells McGavin regarding the two bulls was lifted from the Pat Conroy novel The Great Santini (which was made into a movie that also starred Duvall) and explains how the character Lt. Col. "Bull" Meechum got his nickname.

Real gang members were hired as "on-location security" as well as actors/extras by producer Robert H. Solo. Two of them were shot during filming.

On April 2, 1987, Sean Penn was arrested for punching an extra on the set of this film who was taking photos of him without permission. Penn was sentenced to 33 days in jail for this assault.

Soundtrack

A soundtrack containing mainly hip hop music was released on April 15, 1988, by Warner Bros. Records. It peaked at 31 on the Billboard 200 and was certified gold on July 12, 1988.

The theme song, "Colors", was written and performed by American rapper Ice-T, and issued as the title track for the soundtrack to the film.

Reception
The movie received both praise and criticism. The film has a 74% rating on Rotten Tomatoes based on 39 reviews, with the consensus; "Colors takes a hard-hitting yet nuanced look at urban gang violence, further elevated by strong performances from a pair of well-matched leads." 

Janet Maslin of The New York Times stated that it "has a superb eye for the poisonous flowering of gang culture amid ghetto life, and an ear to match; along with brilliant cinematography by Haskell Wexler, it's also got a fierce, rollicking sense of motion."

Roger Ebert hailed it as "a special movie – not just a police thriller, but a movie that has researched gangs and given some thought to what it wants to say about them."

The Washington Post's critics, Desson Howe and Hal Hinson were split, with Howe stating that Hopper "covers the mayhem with unadorned, documentary immediacy that transcends otherwise formulaic cop-fare" and Hinson stating that it "must be the least incendiary film about gang life ever made."

One of the more negative reviews of the film appeared on the BBC's Ceefax service, on which critic Louise Hart remarked: "The main weakness of the film is that it concentrates far less on the street gangs than on the growing relationship between the two cops."

Box office
The movie earned over $46 million in its domestic release.

Legacy
The film has been credited with inspiring gang violence in the country of Belize, with many members of the Crips and Bloods deported to the country from the United States in the 1990s bringing the film - and their own gang affiliations - with them to the country.

See also 

 List of hood films

References

External links
 
 
 

1988 films
1988 action thriller films
1980s buddy drama films
1988 crime drama films
1980s gang films
1988 independent films
American action thriller films
American buddy drama films
American buddy cop films
American crime drama films
American gang films
American independent films
Bloods
Crips
Fictional portrayals of the Los Angeles Police Department
Films about racism
Films directed by Dennis Hopper
Films scored by Herbie Hancock
Films set in Los Angeles
Films shot in Los Angeles
Hood films
American neo-noir films
Orion Pictures films
American police detective films
1980s Spanish-language films
Sureños
African-American action films
Hispanic and Latino American action films
Hispanic and Latino American crime films
1980s buddy cop films
1988 drama films
1980s English-language films
1980s American films